The 2000 Insurrextion was the inaugural Insurrextion professional wrestling pay-per-view event produced by the American promotion, World Wrestling Federation (WWF, now WWE). It took place on May 6, 2000, at the Earls Court Exhibition Centre in London, England. The event was broadcast exclusively in the United Kingdom.

Production

Background
In 1999, the American professional wrestling promotion World Wrestling Federation (WWF, now WWE) ran two pay-per-views (PPV) in, and broadcast exclusively for, the United Kingdom. The first was No Mercy, which was held in May, and the second was Rebellion in October; the No Mercy name was later used for another PPV held in the United States that same month, which became a mainstay on WWF's PPV calendar. In early 2000, the promotion announced that May's United Kingdom-exclusive event would be titled Insurrextion. It was scheduled to be held on May 6, 2000, at the Earls Court Exhibition Centre in London, England.

Storylines
The event featured ten professional wrestling matches and two pre-show matches that involved different wrestlers from pre-existing scripted feuds and storylines. Wrestlers portrayed villains, heroes, or less distinguishable characters in the scripted events that built tension and culminated in a wrestling match or series of matches.

Aftermath
A second Insurrextion event was held the following year, also in the United Kingdom, thus establishing Insurrextion as an annual UK-exclusive PPV for the promotion. The event was discontinued after its 2003 event as the promotion started to broadcast Raw and SmackDown! from the UK in 2004.

Reception
In 2008, J.D. Dunn of 411Mania gave the event a rating of 7.5 [Good], stating, "Normally a nothing PPV, this rivals the US PPVs in terms of quality. Sadly, the Benoit/Angle match was kept short due to Benoit's eye injury. Most of the stuff here was either good wrestling or had some sort of fun element involved.
Thumbs up."

Results

Other on-screen talent

See also

Professional wrestling in the United Kingdom

References

Professional wrestling in England
2000 in England
2000 in London
Events in London
May 2000 events in the United Kingdom
2000 WWF pay-per-view events
WWE Insurrextion